Léon Jehin (17 July 1853 – 14 February 1928) was a conductor and composer, especially associated with the opera house in Monte Carlo. He composed the national anthem of Monaco.

Life and career
Jehin was born in Spa, Belgium. He studied at the conservatoire in Liege and then in Brussels. He was a violinist at La Monnaie in the Belgian capital and conducted at Anvers, Aix-les-Bains, and the Royal Opera House. In 1889, when he was an assistant conductor in Brussels, he succeeded Arthur Steck as the conductor of the Monte Carlo Opera in Monaco, a position he held until his death. His first performance there was of Mireille by Charles Gounod.

In addition to conducting the main repertoire at the Monte Carlo opera, he conducted the premieres of the following operas:
 Hulda (Franck) 8 March 1894
 La jacquerie (Édouard Lalo and Arthur Coquard) 9 May 1895
 Ghiselle (Franck) 30 March 1896
 Messaline (Isidore de Lara) 21 March 1899
 Le jongleur de Notre-Dame (Massenet) 18 February 1902
 Chérubin (Massenet) 14 February 1905
 L'ancêtre (Saint-Saëns) 24 February 1906
 Don Procopio (Bizet) 10 March 1906
 Thérèse (Massenet) 7 February 1907
 Don Quichotte (Massenet) 19 February 1910
 Déjanire (Saint-Saëns) 14 March 1911
 Roma (Massenet) 17 February 1912
 Pénélope (Fauré) 4 March 1913
 Cléopâtre (Massenet) 23 February 1914
 Béatrice (Messager) 21 March 1914
 Amadis (Massenet) 1 April 1922

In 1889 he married the mezzo-soprano Blanche Deschamps, with whom he had worked in Brussels. 

In 1910, at La Monnaie, Jehin conducted Don Quichotte with the premiere cast and the Monte Carlo orchestra, as well as Ivan le terrible (premiere), and Le vieil aigle by Raoul Gunsbourg.  He died in Monaco, aged 74. In 1953, a centennial concert was held in his memory in the Monte Carlo Casino.

Compositions
Jehin’s compositions include a Hymne à la Charte for soloists, chorus, and orchestra (Monte-Carlo, 1889), Scherzo symphonique (1902), Intermezzo for horn and orchestra (1909), a Marche Inaugurale (for the opening of the Musée Océanographique, 1909), and a Suite symphonique (1921).

References

1853 births
1928 deaths
People from Spa, Belgium
French conductors (music)
French male conductors (music)
Music directors (opera)
Monegasque musicians